13 Ceti is a triple star system in the equatorial constellation of Cetus. It is dimly visible to the naked eye with a combined apparent visual magnitude of 5.20. The system is located at a distance of approximately 69 light years from the Sun based on stellar parallax, and is drifting further away with a radial velocity of +10.4 km/s. It shares a common motion with the Hyades moving group, although it is too old to be a member.

This star was identified as a visual binary system by G. W. Hough in 1844 and given the identifier HO 212. The brighter member, designated component A, is an F-type main-sequence star with a stellar classification of F6 V and a visual magnitude of 5.61. It appears to have an active chromosphere and is classified as an RS Canum Venaticorum variable with a variable star designation of BU Cet. The star was detected as a source of soft X-ray emission by EXOSAT. It has 18% more mass than the Sun and is estimated to be about four billion years old.

In 1907, E. B. Frost discovered the primary is a spectroscopic binary, making this a triple star system. This is a double-lined spectroscopic binary with a period of 2.1 days and a circularized orbit. The companion signature was confirmed using the separated fringe packet technique with the CHARA array. It is most likely a K-type main-sequence star with a class of K3.5 V and 70% of the mass of the Sun.

The secondary member of the visual binary, designated component B, is a G-type main-sequence star with a class of G4 V. It has 90% of the Sun's mass and a visual magnitude of 6.90. A distant visual companion to this system was detected by S. W. Burnham in 1877. Designated component C, this star is a background object of magnitude 12.50.

References 

F-type main-sequence stars
G-type main-sequence stars
K-type main-sequence stars
RS Canum Venaticorum variables
Triple stars
Spectroscopic binaries

Cetus (constellation)
BD-04 0062
Ceti, 13
0023
003196
002762
0142
Ceti, BE